Vimolj may refer to several places in Slovenia:

Vimolj, Kostel, a settlement in the Municipality of Kostel
Vimolj, Semič, a settlement in the Municipality of Semič
Vimolj pri Predgradu, a settlement in the Municipality of Kočevje